Abbas Sami'i was an Iranian politician who held office as the third head of the Environmental Protection Organization.

Sami'i came from a bazaari family. A co-founder of Freedom Movement of Iran, he was considered among the main figures of the party's more secular faction and had socialist tendencies, like Rahim Ata'i.

References

People from Tehran
Freedom Movement of Iran politicians
Possibly living people
Year of birth missing
Members of the Association for Defense of Freedom and the Sovereignty of the Iranian Nation
Heads of Department of Environment (Iran)